Lieutenant General Carl Göran Mårtensson (born 26 May 1960) is a Swedish Army officer. He is currently the Director General of the Swedish Defence Materiel Administration.

Career
Mårtensson was born in Kristianstad, Sweden. He became a lieutenant in 1983 and captain in 1984. Mårtensson served as company commander in the Wendes Artillery Regiment (A 3) in 1989 and attended the Junior Staff Course at the Swedish Armed Forces Staff College from 1989 to 1990. He was promoted to major in 1990 and then attended the Advanced Staff Course at the Swedish Armed Forces Staff College from 1991 to 1993. Mårtensson served as a General Staff Aspirant at the Swedish Defence Materiel Administration in 1993 and at the Army Command (Arméledningen) at the Swedish Armed Forces Headquarters in 1994. He then served as Planning Officer at the Army Command (Arméledningen) at the Swedish Armed Forces Headquarters in 1995 and as ADC to the Chief of Army Staff two years later. Mårtensson was promoted to lieutenant colonel in 1998 and attended the Joint Command and Staff College in London from 1998 to 1999.

In 1999, he returned to his old unit, Wendes Artillery Regiment, as battalion commander and head of training. The year after, Mårtensson was appointed chief of the Unit Section (Förbandssektionen) in the General Training and Management Directorate (Grundorganisationsledningen) at the Swedish Armed Forces Headquarters in Stockholm. In 2002, he was promoted to colonel and appointed commanding officer of the Artillery Regiment, School of Artillery and the Kristinehamn Garrison. Mårtensson stayed in this position for four years, during this time responsible for relocation of the regiment to Boden in 2005. In 2006 he was appointed commanding officer of the Land Warfare Centre in Skövde and Kvarn. He was appointed Assistant Chief of Armed Forces Training & Procurement and promoted to brigadier general in 2007 and appointed Chief of Armed Forces Training & Procurement and promoted to major general in January 2009 when he and lieutenant general Anders Silwer changed positions.  He was promoted to lieutenant general later that same year.

In 2014, Mårtensson was appointed Chief of Joint Operations and head of the Joint Forces Command, a position he held for two years. He was from 2009 to 2016 when he retired from the Swedish Armed Forces, a member of the Swedish Armed Forces Command Group (Försvarsmaktsledningen). Mårtensson was then appointed Director General of the Swedish Defence Materiel Administration (FMV) from 1 February 2016 and National Armament Director. On 20 October 2021, the Swedish government decided to extend Mårtensson's employment as Director General and head of the Swedish Defence Materiel Administration from 1 February 2022 to 31 January 2025.

Personal life
Mårtensson is married and has three children.

Dates of rank
1983 – Lieutenant
1984 – Captain
1990 – Major
1998 – Lieutenant colonel
2002 – Colonel
2007 – Brigadier general
2009 – Major general
2009 – Lieutenant general

Awards
   For Zealous and Devoted Service of the Realm
   Swedish Armed Forces Conscript Medal
   Artillery Regiment (A 9) Medal of Medal (Artilleriregementets förtjänstmedalj)
   Swedish Reserve Officers Federation Merit Badge (Förbundet Sveriges Reservofficerares förtjänsttecken)
  Artillery Regiment (A 9) Commemorative Medal (Artilleriregementets (A 9) minnesmedalj) (2005)
 etc

Honours
Member of the board of the Swedish Defence Materiel Administration (2014)
Member of the Royal Swedish Academy of War Sciences (2003)
Member of the board of the Swedish Defence University (2010–2016)

References

1960 births
Living people
Swedish Army lieutenant generals
People from Kristianstad Municipality
Members of the Royal Swedish Academy of War Sciences